Hypotia bolinalis is a species of snout moth in the genus Hypotia. It was described by Francis Walker in 1859. It is found in South Africa.

References

Endemic moths of South Africa
Moths described in 1859
Snout moths of Africa
Moths of Africa